A chase gun (or chaser), usually distinguished as bow chaser and stern chaser, was a cannon mounted in the bow (aiming forward) or stern (aiming backward) of a sailing ship. They were used to attempt to slow down an enemy ship either chasing (pursuing) or being chased, when the ship's broadside could not be brought to bear. Typically, the chasers were used to attempt to damage the rigging and thereby cause the target to lose performance.

Bow chasers could be regular guns brought up from the gundeck and aimed through specially cut-out ports on either side of the bowsprit, or dedicated weapons made with an unusually long bore and a relatively light ball, and mounted in the bow. Stern chasers could also be improvised, or left permanently in the cabins at the stern, covered up and used as part of the furniture.

Development
In the Age of Sail, shiphandling had been brought to a high art, and chases frequently lasted for hours or sometimes days, as each crew fine-tuned their sails to take advantage of small variations in the wind. Chase guns of this era were commonly made of brass rather than iron, as this improved their accuracy. A single lucky shot could cut through a critical line, or cause a sail to split if the wind was strong, so if the ships were within range the best gunners on each would use their chasers to make carefully aimed and timed shots at the other. Despite this, most chase guns were of limited accuracy even when aiming at the sizeable target of an enemy ship's rigging. In one eighteenth-century example, a British crew fired seventy-two shots from their vessels' bow chasers before hitting the sails of a fleeing enemy craft.

By the late eighteenth century, Royal Navy crews were progressively being trained in the use of artillery in chases. The cannons themselves were also modified to maximise their effectiveness as chase guns, including reshaping of their gun carriages to allow for greater elevation and longer range. From 1799 Royal Navy frigates were universally supplied with two bow and two stern chasers, as these were the vessels most likely to be engaged in the pursuit of fleeing enemies.

See also 

 Apilan and kota mara
 Gun shield
 History of gunpowder
 Naval artillery in the Age of Sail
 Naval tactics in the Age of Sail

References

Bibliography
  

Naval artillery